The Tiger of Jalisco (Spanish:El tigre de Jalisco) is a 1947 Mexican western film directed by René Cardona and starring Armando Soto La Marina, Delia Magana and Manolo Fábregas.

Cast
 Armando Soto La Marina as León Bravo 
 Delia Magaña as Cinda 
 Manolo Fábregas as Eduardo 
 Beatriz Aguirre as Rosita 
 Luis G. Barreiro as Don Pancho  
 Miguel Inclán as Tigre de Pedrero  
 Alfonso Bedoya as Bandido 
 Juan Pulido as Don Ruperto, señor alcalde  
 Fanny Schiller as Tía de Mary, tourist  
 Maria Stein as Mary, tourist  
 Teté Casuso as Rita, actress  
 Enrique Peña Franco
 Manuel Noriega as Puerta 
 Julio Ahuet as Cantinero  
 Guillermo Bravo Sosa as Don Matías  
 José Escanero as Don Cenón  
 Edmundo Espino as Señor juez  
 María Gentil Arcos as Mamá de Eduardo  
 Sara Montes as Mujer en restaurante 
 José Muño as Inspector Ordóñez  
 Ignacio Peón as Pueblerino  
 Humberto Rodríguez as Pueblerino  
 María Luisa Smith as Pueblerina

References

Bibliography 
 Rogelio Agrasánchez. Mexican Movies in the United States: A History of the Films, Theaters, and Audiences, 1920-1960. McFarland, 2006.

External links 
 

1947 films
1947 Western (genre) films
Mexican Western (genre) films
1940s Spanish-language films
Films directed by René Cardona
Films set in Mexico
Mexican black-and-white films
1940s Mexican films